"Really Really" is a song by American rapper Kevin Gates. It was released on October 9, 2015, as the second single from his debut studio album Islah.

Music video
The song's accompanying music video premiered on December 11, 2015 on Kevin Gates's YouTube account. Since its release, the video has received over 240 million views on YouTube.

Chart performance
"Really Really" debuted at number 94 on the US Billboard Hot 100 for the chart dated January 9, 2016. It eventually reached its peak at number 46 for the chart dated July 9, 2016. On January 25, 2019, the single was certified triple platinum for combined sales and streaming data of over three million units in the United States.

Charts

Weekly charts

Year-end charts

Certifications

References

External links

Kevin Gates songs
2015 songs
2015 singles
Atlantic Records singles
Song recordings produced by Drumma Boy
Songs written by Cook Classics